Jean Kent (born 1951) is an Australian poet.

Education
Jean Kent was educated at the Glennie Memorial School in Toowoomba and graduated from University of Queensland with Bachelor of Arts majoring in psychology. She has worked in vocational guidance, educational guidance of disabled children, counselling of students and staff in TAFE colleges and, most recently, teaching creative writing.  Jean now lives on the New South Wales north coast, which is a feature in her verse, as well the memories and experiences formed in youth and childhood in South East Queensland.

Literary career

Kent has published stories in many of Australia's quality literary magazines such as Overland, Westerly, Outrider, Imago, Australian Short Stories and Meanjin as well as in the American-based Antiopodes. She has published five poetry collections. Travelling with the Wrong Phrasebooks included poems about her travels in Paris and Lithuania. Her latest The Hour of Silvered Mullet contemplates her rural past and lakeside present and was published by Pitt Street Poetry in 2015.

Critical reaction
Martin Duwell writing in Australian Poetry Review described Travelling with the Wrong Phrasebooks as "an immensely likable collection, so likable that readers may miss some of its sophistication, thinking it no more than a set of poems about travels in France and Lithuania. It is actually a good deal more than that."

Awards
 Josephine Ulrick National Poetry Prize (1999)  
 Wesley Michel Wright Prize for Poetry (1998) 
 the Association for the Study of Australian Literature's Mary Gilmore Award (1991) 
 FAW Anne Elder Poetry Award (1990) 
 Henry Kendall Poetry Competition (1988 and 1989)
 the National Library Poetry Competition (1988)

Works
 Verandahs (Hale and Iremonger, 1990; republished by Picaro Press, 2009), 
 Practising Breathing (Hale and Iremonger, 1991), 
 The Satin Bowerbird (Hale and Iremonger, 1998) 
 The Spaghetti Maker, a chapbook of selected poems, was published by Picaro Press in 2002
 Travelling with the Wrong Phrasebooks (Pitt Street Poetry, 2012)
 The Language of Light (Association of Stories in Macao and Cerberus Press, 2013)
 The Hour of Silvered Mullet (Pitt Street Poetry, 2015)

See also
List of Australian poets

References

External links

Biography at Pitt Street Poetry (current publisher)

1951 births
Living people
Australian women poets
People from New South Wales
Women anthologists
University of Queensland alumni
20th-century Australian women
20th-century Australian poets